The R758 road is a regional road in County Wicklow, Ireland. It connects the R756 to the N81. The road travels through the village of Valleymount and crosses Poulaphouca Reservoir via two bridges.

References

Regional roads in the Republic of Ireland
Roads in County Wicklow